Virginia Water railway station serves the village of Virginia Water, in Surrey, England. The station, and all trains serving it, are operated by South Western Railway.

The Waterloo to Reading Line and the Chertsey Branch Line join here with the platforms at the junction, as seen in the photograph (taken facing south). Trains from Weybridge and to Reading use either side of a V-shaped platform, allowing cross-platform interchange; the junction of the tracks is at the London end of the station. This station now has ticket barriers operational.

History
Formerly a chord south of the station connected the Chertsey and Reading lines.

The station received a new station building in 1973 by British Rail, similarly treated to Wokingham and Sunningdale, from prefabricated concrete. The building is at the right of the photograph.

Modernisation in recent years provides ticket barriers and a bridge for step free access to platforms, incorporating lifts.

Platforms

Virginia Water station has four platforms.

Platform 1 - Semi-fast trains to London Waterloo via Richmond.
Platform 2 - Trains to Ascot, Reading and stations to Farnham in peak hours. 
Platform 3 - Stopping service to London Waterloo via Hounslow.
Platform 4 - Trains to Weybridge, or Woking on Sunday.

Services
The off peak, Monday to Saturday service is formed of:
 4 to London Waterloo, of which:
 2 are semi-fast, via  and 
 2 are stopping via 
 2 to 

Peak additional services:

2 to 

References

External links 

Railway stations in Surrey
DfT Category D stations
Former London and South Western Railway stations
Railway stations in Great Britain opened in 1856
Railway stations served by South Western Railway